Dean Cooley (born January 4, 1934) is a former member of the Arizona House of Representatives. He served in the House from January 1997 through January 2003, serving district 21.

References

Republican Party members of the Arizona House of Representatives
1934 births
Living people